Alvin Enrique Colina (born December 26, 1981) is a retired professional baseball catcher. He played in Major League Baseball for the Colorado Rockies in 2006–2007.

Career
He collected an RBI single in his first at-bat.

Colina was designated for assignment by the Rockies September 7, and claimed off waivers by the Cincinnati Reds on September 11. Colina did not play for the Reds and became a free agent after the season. On December 5, 2007, the Reds re-signed Colina to a minor league contract with an invitation to spring training. He became a free agent at the end of the  season and signed a minor league contract with an invitation to spring training with the Atlanta Braves in January . In January 2010 Colina, signed a minor league contract with a Spring Training invitation with Tampa Bay Rays

On March 10, 2011, he signed a contract with the Lancaster Barnstormers. and he has played for two other different teams while being in the Atlantic League from 2011 to 2013.

Colina was traded to the Camden Riversharks where he played for 2 seasons and later played with the Southern Maryland Blue Crabs team. While living in Maryland. He resides in his home country of Venezuela as a retired player.

See also
 List of Major League Baseball players from Venezuela

References

External links

1981 births
Living people
Arizona League Rockies players
Asheville Tourists players
Camden Riversharks players
Colorado Rockies players
Colorado Springs Sky Sox players
Durham Bulls players
Gwinnett Braves players
Lancaster Barnstormers players
Leones del Caracas players
Louisville Bats players
Major League Baseball catchers
Major League Baseball players from Venezuela
Modesto Nuts players
Navegantes del Magallanes players
People from Puerto Cabello
Southern Maryland Blue Crabs players
Tiburones de La Guaira players
Tri-City Dust Devils players
Tulsa Drillers players
Venezuelan expatriate baseball players in the United States
Visalia Oaks players